Mikhail Borisovich Dobriyan (26 June 1947 – 16 November 2013) was a Russian aerospace engineer and a former director of the Space Research Institute of the Russian Academy of Sciences in Tarusa. He was one of the leading figures in the programs of the International Astrophysical Observatory GRANAT and Vega program. Mikhail Dobriyan was a head of Tarussky District and an honorary citizen of the city of Tarusa. There is a street named to honor of Michail B. Dobriyan and a Memorial dedicated to his memory.,,.

Other awards
Order of Lenin 
Order of the Red Banner of Labour 
Order "For Merit to the Fatherland" II class
Medal of Sergey Korolev
Medal "For Battle Merit"

References 

1947 births
2013 deaths
Lenin Prize winners
Soviet aerospace engineers
20th-century Russian engineers
Soviet space program personnel
Rocket scientists
Russian aerospace engineers